Filippo Andrea Francesco Coletti (11 May 1811 – 13 June 1894) was an Italian baritone associated with Giuseppe Verdi. Coletti created two Verdi roles: Gusmano in Alzira and Francesco in I masnadieri. Verdi revised the role of Germont in La traviata for Coletti, whose interpretation re-defined the role as it is known today. Coletti was, with Antonio Tamburini (1800–1876) and Giorgio Ronconi (1810–1890), one of the three leading baritones of 19th century Italy, an early model of a 'Verdi baritone'.

Born in Anagni, a small town southeast of Rome, Coletti started his career singing baritone coloratura roles in Rossini, Donizetti and Mercadante operas before moving on to vocally substantial Verdi repertory. Coletti gained notoriety in London for his unwitting role in the 1840 Haymarket Theatre riots, and later for his successful four-year London tenure, singing leading baritone roles. Coletti travelled extensively, singing in all major European theatres. Numerous accounts describe his acting as well as the beauty of his voice, which retained an agility and elegance over a long singing career. Coletti performed until 1869. Verdi considered casting Coletti in an unrealized King Lear opera-commission for Naples. After Coletti's retirement from the stage he published an Album Melodico of songs, as well as essays on singing and on opera.

For philosopher Thomas Carlyle Coletti was "by the cast of his face, by the tones of his voice, by his general bearing,... a man of deep and ardent sensibilities, of delicate intuitions, just sympathies; originally an almost poetic soul, or man of genius."

Family background 

Filippo Andrea Francesco Coletti was born on 11 May 1811 in Anagni, a medieval town located east-southeast of Rome, in the district of Frosinone.

Coletti's parents, Venanzio Coletti and Angela Viti, were of modest means and education. The Colettis had eight children: Rosa, Filippo, Andrea, Alessandro, Temistocle, Domenico and two other daughters. The family lived in the town center, on the corner of Via Maggiore and Vicolo Cellacchio. With Filippo Coletti's singing fees which were administered by his father Venanzio, the family moved into a large property outside Anagni in 1843. Venanzio continued to invest in land and buildings. Upon the death of Venanzio, the administration was taken over by Coletti's brother Andrea. The Coletti estate exists today as a winery, Coletti-Conti. Coletti's younger brother Domenico was an opera singer who moved to the United States and lived in New York.

In 1845 the 33-year-old Coletti married the seventeen-year-old Maria, daughter of Anagni's town clerk (Segretario comunale) Giovanni Ambrosi. The marriage was arranged by Coletti's father Venanzio, and proved to be a happy one. Filippo and Maria had four children: Tito, Decio, Lavinia and Valeria.

Early career 1834–1840 

Coletti started his musical education in Rome, then moved to the Naples Real Collegio di Musica, where he studied with the tenor Alessandro Busti, a pupil of the castrato Girolamo Crescenti. Busti dedicated to Coletti a Studio di canto per baritono (published 1874). Coletti débuted at the Teatro del Fondo (1834) as Prosdocimo in Rossini's Il turco in Italia. His performance was considered a great success by the court and launched his career.

Coletti transferred to the neighboring Teatro San Carlo, where he sang coloratura and bel canto roles in Vincenzo Bellini's La straniera (Valdeburgo), Rossini's Mosè in Egitto, Maometto II and Semiramide (Assur), as well as Giuseppe Curci's cantata Ruggiero, in January 1835. Later that year Coletti created his first of many roles in a Giovanni Pacini opera – Briano/Wilfredo in Ivanhoe. Beyond Naples, Coletti appeared in the Carlo Felice in Genoa in the 1835–1836 season, sang in Donizetti's Gemma di Vergy at the Teatro Valle in Rome, and in Bellini's I puritani in Padova (1836).

A four-year engagement at the Real Teatro de São Carlos in Lisbon (1837–40) included the first Lisbon production of Mozart's Don Giovanni, operas by the Ricci brothers, Saverio Mercadante, Giuseppe Persiani and Ferdinand Hérold as well as the title roles of Donizetti's Torquato Tasso (January 1837) and Marin Faliero, Prospero Salsapariglia in Donizetti's Le convenienze ed inconvenienze teatrali and the role of Visconti in Bellini's Beatrice di Tenda. During his time in Lisbon Coletti appeared in a new role almost every week. By the time he left Lisbon, after singing a last Belcore in Donizetti's L'elisir d'amore in November 1840, Coletti had covered most of the bel-canto baritone repertoire of Rossini, Bellini and Donizetti.

London riot of 1840 
Pierre Laporte, the impresario of Her Majesty's Theatre in London, engaged the talented but unknown Coletti as replacement for the public's idol, the baritone Antonio Tamburini, (1800–1876). Laporte hoped to get rid of the expensive Tamburini, thinking Coletti his equal and casting him in I puritani. But as talented as was Coletti, he was not a member of the 'old guard', and the diva Giulia Grisi and others instigated a riot.
The opera passed off in perfect quiet; and, indeed, was received with the usual applause, of which Coletti, who has been substituted for Tamburini, received a very considerable share – an indication, no doubt, on the part of the intended insurgents, that there was no personal feeling against this excellent performer. When the opera was over cries began to be raised of "Laporte!" and "Tamburini!" which went on increasing and spreading in all parts of the house, till they swelled into a raging storm.
This riot became a milestone event mentioned in the Musical Times, as late as 1868, when the Haymarket Theatre burned down. R. H. Barham describes the riot in A row in an omnibus (i.e. 'theatre box'): A legend of the Haymarket (from Barham's Ingoldsby Legends):
Though Fiddle-de-dee (i.e. Tamburini) sings loud and clear,
And his tones are sweet, yet his terms are dear!
The "glove won't fit!"
The deuce a bit.
I shall give an engagement to Fal-de-ral-tit!
(i.e. Coletti. Coletti's singing however, failed to convince the audience completely:)

The Prompter bow'd, and he went to his stall,
And the green baize rose at the Prompter's call,
And Fal-de-ral-tit sang fol-de-rol-lol;
But, scarce had he done
When a 'row' begun,
Such a noise was never heard under the sun.
Fiddle-de-dee!
Where is he?
He's the Artiste whom we all want to see!

Italy 1841–1846 
Returning to Europe, Coletti sang in Vienna, Bologna and in Bergamo, where he met Donizetti, who travelled from Milan to Bergamo to hear Coletti perform in his Marin Faliero. Coletti sang Donizetti's Torquato Tasso and Bellini's Beatrice di Tenda in La Scala in 1841, creating there the role of Edmondo in Otto Nicolai's Il Proscritto (1841). After creating the title role of Pacini's Duca d'Alba in Teatro La Fenice (1842) in Venice, Coletti moved to Naples, where he would remain till 1846 as San Carlo's leading baritone. In Naples Giovanni Pacini wrote the role of Piero Zampardi in his opera Fidanzata Corsa (1842) for Coletti; the opera and Coletti's performance proved a hugh success. Coletti created Lusignano in Gaetano Donizetti's Caterina Cornaro (1844). The opera suffered a disastrous opening night, and Donizetti blamed the cast and Coletti for the failure. The relationship between the two was repaired a few months later, when Donizetti returned to Naples to mount Maria di Rohan. In 1845 Coletti created Gusmano in Verdi's Alzira. The tenor Gaetano Fraschini, who sang frequently with Coletti, created the role of Zamoro. Eugenia Tadolini sang the role of Alzira. Verdi had insisted on Coletti's participation by contract, and proved faithful to Coletti for many years to come. Coletti was also Verdi's first choice for the opera Una vendetta in domino intended for Naples and never written.

Coletti sang the 1846 first performance of Verdi's I due Foscari in Paris, and in the season 1847–48 sang the title role of Mozart's Don Giovanni, and in the Rossini's operas La gazza ladra and La donna del lago. Vienna, Prague, Dresden, Leipzig, and Cologne followed.

Second London period 1847–1851 and I masnadieri 

Following star-baritone Tamburini's defection to Covent Garden, Coletti returned to Her Majesty's Theatre, hired by Laporte's successor, Benjamin Lumley. Lumley chose Verdi's Nabucco "in order to introduce Coletti, who appeared in the part of the maddened king (previously so effectively sustained by Fornasari), and was welcomed with enthusiasm." Benjamin Lumley was determained to procure the best artists for his theatre. He had been corresponding with Giuseppe Verdi
for the purpose of obtaining from him a work destined for the London boards. An opera on the subject of "King Lear" had already been promised by Verdi, the principal part being intended for Signor Lablache. But, on that occasion, the serious illness of the composer had prevented the execution of the design. Verdi now offered his "Masnadieri", composed upon the subject of Schiller's well-known play, "Die Räuber", and with this proposal I was obliged to close. On Thursday, 2 July, I masnadieri (after wearying rehearsals, conducted by the composer himself), was brought out, with a cast that included Lablache, Gardoni, Coletti, Bouche, and, above all, Jenny Lind, who was to appear for the second time only in her career, in a thoroughly original part composed expressly for her.

The house was filled to overflowing on the night of the first representation. The opera was given with every appearance of a triumphant success : the composer and all the singers receiving the highest honours. Indeed, all the artists distinguished themselves in their several parts. Jenny Lind acted admirably, and sang the airs allotted to her exquisitely.

For Coletti the role creation of Francesco in Verdi's I masnadieri, conducted by Verdi himself, was a personal success: "Coletti's reception by the public on Saturday night had added another laurel to Mr. Lumley's brow, and has given the public increased confidence in all the promises set forth in his so fiercely catechized prospectus. Never was an opera season so auspiciously commenced. Verdi had re-written the cabaletta of his aria for Francesco 'Tremate o Miseri' after hearing Coletti's voice. Coletti remained present in London until 1850, singing diverse roles in the Italian baritone repertoire, performing in Linda di Chamounix, I Puritani, L'elisir d'amore, and most notably the Doge in Verdi's I due Foscari. In London Coletti created roles in Sigismond Thalberg's Florinda and Balfe's I quattro fratelli, as well as the role of Ferdinand in Halévy's La tempesta in 1850.

Maturity 1848–1861 

Coletti performed for three seasons in St Petersburg (1848–51) singing in Verdi's I Lombardi and Rossini's Guglielmo Tell. He also travelled as far as the United States. He also performed in Madrid in the 1851–1852 season.

In Rome Coletti sang Rigoletto in 1851, (the opera given under the censured title 'Viscardello'), I due Foscari, Un ballo in maschera (T. Apollo, 1854) and I vespri siciliani (T. Argentina, 1856). He also created the role of Hamlet in Luigi Moroni's Amleto (1860).

In Venice La Fenice Coletti sang in Lucia di Lammermoor, Verdi's I due Foscari and Stiffelio (1852) (which he sang in La Scala as well, in 1851). In 1854 Verdi transposed down the part of Germont in La traviata for him. This version, as performed at the Venice Teatro Gallo, (Teatro San Benedetto) became definitive: The Gazzetta Musicale di Milano maintained that Coletti, in this revival of La Traviata, "had made one know the character of Germont for the first time truly, that Coletti would then proceed to interpret innumerable times in all theatres of Italy"

In 1857 Coletti created the title role of Saverio Mercadante's Pelagio at the Teatro S Carlo, Naples (1857). Verdi was considering Coletti as the title role in his opera Re Lear for Naples, (which he never wrote). In a letter from that period regarding a revival of Simon Boccanegra, Verdi writes:
If you really intend to mount Boccanegra, an ideal cast would be Coletti, Fraschini and Penco as well as a Basso profundo, which one would still need to find. It would be a mistake to perform this opera with another cast! There is no one better than Coletti for the Doge.Christian Springer, Giuseppe Verdi: "Simon Boccanegra": Dokumente – Materialien – Texte zur Entstehung und Rezeption der beiden Fassungen, 2008, Praesens Verlag, 

In 1858 the caricaturist Melchiorre Delfico drew Verdi at the piano rehearsing Simon Boccanegra Verdi is depicted at the piano with his back to the viewer, Coletti to his right, reading off a sheet of music while Fraschini and the rest of the Simon Boccanegra cast stand around staring.

Retirement from the stage 

In the season 1861–1862 Coletti, no longer first choice in Italy, found work in the Teatro Real, Madrid, singing in Donizetti and Verdi operas as well as Achille Peri's Giuditta. In Naples he created his last new role – Appio Claudio in Errico Petrella's Virginia; But Coletti's voice had deteriorated to the extent that he was forced into retirement. After a few years of teaching and living alternately between Rome and Anagni, Coletti wrote Verdi in 1866 asking for help. Verdi responded with warmth and delicacy, but could not help him.

Coletti attempted a brief comeback in 1867, singing the bass role of Mefistofeles in Gounod's Faust in Palermo, earning applause and a polite review. Another bass role Coletti sang that year was Filippo II in Verdi's Don Carlo in Turin. Always a beloved artist in San Carlo in Naples, Coletti was rehired for the 1868–69 season, but after a "tempestuous performance of the opening opera of the season, Jone by E. Petrella on 28 October, he dissolved the contract and retired for good". Coletti moved to Rome, then to his hometown Anagni. In his later years Coletti became involved with Anagni civic duties, as well as teaching – (Édouard de Reszke was one of his pupils) and writing. Coletti published an Album Melodico of songs a treatise on singing, La scuola di canto italiano (Rome, Forzani, 1880), and an essay on the state of Italian opera, L' Arte Melodrammatica Italiana (Rome, Forzani, 1883). Nothing much is known of his last years in Anagni. Coletti was working on a 'method of singing', which remained unfinished at his death. His manuscript breaks off at the point where he writes: "I cease writing musical notes because my sight, weakened by my old age, is becoming ever more obscured, hence I need to suspend my work, with the intention of continuing it and completing it if the good Lord wants to keep me living for a bit longer".

Coletti died in 1894. In his obituary, The Musical Times of 1 August 1894 said of Coletti: "he is also memorable as the sole performer in whom Carlyle saw any merit on his famous visit to the opera".

Critical appreciation 

Philosopher and writer Thomas Carlyle: "One singer in particular, called Coletti or some such name, seemed to me, by the cast of his face, by the tones of his voice, by his general bearing, so far as I could read it, to be a man of deep and ardent sensibilities, of delicate intuitions, just sympathies; originally an almost poetic soul, or man of genius, as we term it;"

Italian opera composer Giovanni Pacini, from his Memoires: "The celebrated Coletti in the role I entrusted him was not able to be surpassed by any other artist. Even Paris, when my fortunate work was presented at the Theatre Italienne, proclaimed Coletti 'The Greatest', 'unreachable'."

From the nineteenth-century British music journal Musical World: "The faults we have to lay to his charge – for which of us is without them? – are a want of colour in his expression, a monotony in the form of his cadences, and a method of reaching the high notes, which belongs to a bad school of singing."

Lexicographer Francesco Regli writes: "One observes with great astonishment the ease with which he executed the most difficult of roles, dramatic as well as those of agility, the extraordinary extension of his voice and the colour that is so indispensable in the various characters in the music."

Roles created 

 1835 Briano/Wilfrido Giovanni Pacini Ivanhoe Teatro San Carlo, Naples
 1836 Rodolfo/Alì Pascia Tommaso Genoves (Spanish composer Tomás Genovés y Lapetra) La battaglia di Lepanto, Teatro Valle, Rome
 1841 Edmondo Otto Nicolai Il Proscritto, La Scala, Milan
 1841 Cantareno Carlo Emery Coen (the artistic name of composer Henry Cohen) Antonio Foscarini, Teatro del Comune, Bologna
 1842 Piero Zampardi Giovanni Pacini La fidanzata corsa Teatro San Carlo, Naples
 1842 Egbert Alessandro Curmi Elodia di Herstall 26 September 1842 with Eugenia Tadolini as Elodia
 1842 Duca d'Alba Giovanni Pacini Duca d'Alba Teatro La Fenice, Venice
 1844 Lusignano Gaetano Donizetti Caterina Cornaro Teatro San Carlo, Naples
 1844 Pietro Candiano IV Giovanni Battista Ferrari Candiano quarto Teatro Gallo San Benedetto, Venice
 1844 Francesco Sforza Vincenzo Battista (Italian composer 1823–1873) Margherita d'Aragona Teatro San Carlo, Naples
 1845 Gusmano Giuseppe Verdi Alzira Teatro San Carlo, Naples
 1845 Rodrigo Saverio Mercadante Il Vascello de Gama, Teatro San Carlo, Naples
 1845 Gianni di Capua, Giovanni Pacini Stella di Napoli, Teatro San Carlo, Naples
 1847 Francesco Giuseppe Verdi I masnadieri Haymarket Theatre, London
 1850 Ferdinand Halévy La tempesta (The Tempest) Haymarket Theatre, London
 1851 Ivon Michael William Balfe I quattro fratelli Haymarket Theatre, London
 1851 Manuzza Sigismond Thalberg Florinda Haymarket Theatre, London
 1851 Morillo Gualtiero Sanelli (It. comp. and tenor Ferdinando Sanelli 1816–1861) Tradito! La Fenice, Venice
 1856 Luchino Visconti, Giovanni Pacini Margherita Pusterla Teatro San Carlo, Naples
 1857 Pelagio Saverio Mercadante Pelagio Teatro San Carlo, Naples
 1857 Carlo Gonzaga Vincenzo Moscuzza Carlo Gonzaga Teatro San Carlo, Naples
 1858 Guglielmo Belfegor-saltimbanco Giovanni Pacini Il saltimbanco, Teatro Argentina, Rome
 1860 Claudio Luigi Moroni (Italian composer, 1823–1898) Amleto
 1861 Appio Claudio Errico Petrella Virginia, Teatro San Carlo, Naples

Bibliography 

 Barham, Richard Harris, (Thomas Ingoldsby), The Ingoldsby Legends, Or Mirth and Marvels, 1840 – 1870, Modern Edition: Carol Hart, Editor., Ingoldsby Legends, Volume 2, SpringStreet Books; annotated edition (2013), 
 Budden, Julian, The Two Traviatas, Proceedings of the Royal Musical Association, Vol. 99, (1972–1973), Pub. Taylor & Francis pp. 43–66
 
 Chorley, Henry Fothergill Thirty Years' Musical Recollections, Volume 1, London: Hurst and blackett, Publishers, 1862, P.183; Modern edition: Cambridge University Press (2009) 
 Cox, J. E. Musical Recollections of the Last Half-Century (London, 1872), Modern Ed. HardPress Ltd (2013), 
 Davison, J. W., Music During the Victorian Era. from Mendelssohn to Wagner; Being the Memoirs of J. W. Davison, Forty Years Music Critic of "The Times", Compiled by his Son, Henry Davison (London, 1912); Modern Ed. Cambridge Scholars Publishing (2010), 
 Harwood, Gregory W. Giuseppe Verdi: A Research and Information Guide (Routledge Music Bibliographies)2012, 
 Leone, Guido L'opera a palermo dal 1653 al 1987, Publisicula editrice, 1988, ASIN: B00450KR04
 Lumley, B., Reminiscences of the Opera, Hurst and Blackett, London, 1864
 Raspa, Giampiero "Note biografiche sul baritono anagnino Filippo Coletti (1811–1894)", in Scritti in memoria di Giuseppe Marchetti Longhi, vol. II, pp. 483ff., Istituto di Storia e di Arte del Lazio Meridionale, 1990. In Italian.
 Review of Coletti's composition for Chorus, 1874 (in Italian)
 Mult. Authors,  "Atti del Convegno su Filippo Coletti", in Latium – Rivista di studi storici – Istituto di Storia e di Arte del Lazio Meridionale, 1996, 13 (Atti del convegno tentuoso nel 1994 ad Anagni, in occasione del centenario della morte di Filippo Coletti. This book contains the following essays from the 1994 convention on Filippo Coletti (all in Italian):
 Julian Budden, Coletti a Londra, p. 121ff.
 Tommaso Cecilia, Filippo Coletti e la vita musicale in Anagni nella prima metá dell'ottocento pp. 159ff.
 Cesare Corsi, Le riflessioni sul canto e le opere didattiche di Filippo Coletti, pp. 145ff.
 Giorgio Gualerzi, Un baritono " storico " per Verdi, p. 115ff.
 Pierluigi Petrobelli, Coletti e Verdi, p. 105ff.
 Teatro La Fenice, Programme notes for Maria di Rohan 1999 
 Zicari, Massimo. Verdi in Victorian London. Cambridge, UK: Open Book Publishers, 2016.

Images (sources) 
 Head-and-shoulders portrait of Filippo Coletti, 19th century baritone opera singer in Rome, 1852
 Filippo Coletti in Rossini's Semiramide
Filippo Coletti in Madrid, dressed in opera costume, photo by Laurant, Madrid; from Ricordi Milan archive

Bibliography: Dictionary entries 

 Laura Macy, Ed. The Grove Book of Opera Singers, Harold Rosenthal/Julian Budden, entry "Coletti, Filippo"
 entry "Coletti, Filippo" in Dizionario Biografico degli Italiani, vol. 26, pp. 734–736, Rome 1982
 entry "Coletti, Filippo" in Enciclopedia dello spettacolo, vol. III, column 1065–66
 Francesco Regli, Dizionario biografico, Turin, 1860, p. 135, entry "Coletti, Filippo"

Filippo Coletti writings (in Italian) 

 Coletti, Filippo, La Scuola di Canto in Italia : pensieri dell'Artista / Cav. Filippo Coletti, Rome : Forzani e C.,
 Coletti, Filippo, L' Arte melodrammatica italiana : patrocinata dall'onorevole Bovio nella Camera dei Deputati : considerazioni / dell'artista Filippo Coletti, Rome : Forzani e C., 1883
 Coletti, Filippo, Sullo stato materiale e morale della Città di Anagni : considerazioni dirette ai signori della giunta municipale anagnina / dall'assessore Filippo Coletti, Rome : Tip. dell'Unione Cooperativa Editrice, 1891

Notes

References 

1811 births
1894 deaths
Italian operatic baritones
19th-century Italian male opera singers